Roknabad (also Romanized as Roknābād; also known as Rokn Abad Nogh) is a village in Ferdows Rural District, Ferdows District, Rafsanjan County, Kerman Province, Iran. At the 2006 census, its population was 755, in 197 families.

References 

Populated places in Rafsanjan County